Taz Taylor may refer to:
Taz Taylor (motorcyclist) (born 1998), British motorcycle racer
Taz Taylor (record producer) (born 1992), American record producer

Taylor, Taz